Fan County or Fanxian falls under the jurisdiction of Puyang, in the northeast of Henan province, China. The Northern Expedition of the Taiping Rebellion attempt to cross the Yellow River at Fanxian.

Administrative divisions
As 2012, this county is divided to 2 towns and 10 townships.
Towns
Chengguan
Pucheng

Townships

Climate

References

External links
Fan County Government official website

County-level divisions of Henan
Puyang